In mathematics, a Lucas–Carmichael number is a positive composite integer n such that
 if p is a prime factor of n, then p + 1 is a factor of n + 1;
 n is odd and square-free.
The first condition resembles the Korselt's criterion for Carmichael numbers, where -1 is replaced with +1. The second condition eliminates from consideration some trivial cases like cubes of prime numbers, such as 8 or 27, which otherwise would be Lucas–Carmichael numbers (since n3 + 1 = (n + 1)(n2 − n + 1) is always divisible by n + 1).

They are named after Édouard Lucas and Robert Carmichael.

Properties 
The smallest Lucas–Carmichael number is 399 = 3 × 7 × 19. It is easy to verify that 3+1, 7+1, and 19+1 are all factors of 399+1 = 400.

The smallest Lucas–Carmichael number with 4 factors is 8855 = 5 × 7 × 11 × 23.

The smallest Lucas–Carmichael number with 5 factors is 588455 = 5 × 7 × 17 × 23 × 43.

It is not known whether any Lucas–Carmichael number is also a Carmichael number.

Thomas Wright proved in 2016 that there are infinitely many Lucas–Carmichael numbers.

.

List of Lucas–Carmichael numbers 
The first few Lucas–Carmichael numbers  and their prime factors are listed below.

References

External links
 
 
 

Integer sequences